Hunter River may refer to:

Hunter River (New South Wales), Australia
Hunter River (Western Australia)
Hunter River, New Zealand
Hunter River (Prince Edward Island), Canada
Hunter River, Prince Edward Island, community on Hunter River, Canada